Richard Weiner is the name of:

Richard Weiner (Czech writer) (1884–1937), Czech writer
Richard Weiner (American author) (1927–2014), American writer
Richard M. Weiner (born 1930), Romanian theoretical physics professor

See also
Weiner (surname)